Rasul (also spelled Rasool, Rasoul, or Resul) is the Arabic for "messenger, apostle", see Apostle (Islam). As a surname, it may refer to:

 Akhtar Rasool, Pakistani field hockey player
 Muhammad Rasool, Pakistani footballer
 Muhib Rasool, Pakistani volleyball player
Zalmai Rassoul

Arabic-language surnames